Oğuzhan Türk (born 17 May 1986) is a Dutch professional footballer who plays as a midfielder.

Club career
Born in Kampen, Overijssel to Turkish parents, Türk started his career in the youth departments of amateur side DOS Kampen, and was later scouted by SC Heerenveen. He failed to break through to the first team, resulting in a loan to Go Ahead Eagles. There, Türk made his professional debut in the 2007–08 Eerste Divisie season for Go Ahead Eagles, in a 6–0 win over FC Emmen on 10 August 2007.

After playing two seasons on loan in Deventer, he was signed by SC Cambuur.

In July 2012, Türk joined VVV-Venlo on a two-year contract. After one season, the team was relegated to the Eerste Divisie. After his contract with VVV-Venlo had expired in June 2014, Türk signed a two-year deal with Gaziantepspor. On 31 December 2015, his contract was terminated by mutual consent. He then signed with Adanaspor on 30 January 2016. 

On 15 August 2016, Türk returned to the Netherlands where he signed a one-year contract with FC Emmen. On 12 July 2017, he signed a two-year deal with Şanlıurfaspor. In 2019, he continued his career with Bodrumspor on a two-year deal. He left the club again in July 2021, after his contract expired.

International career
Türk has been capped at Netherlands under-16 level. His first cap as a youth international was on 25 October 2001 in a 2–1 loss to Germany U16 in a Walker Crisp Tournament game at JJB Stadium in Wigan, England, coming on shortly before half-time for Nick van der Horst.

Honours
Adanaspor
 TFF First League: 2015–16

References

External links
 
 Voetbal International profile 
 
 

1986 births
Living people
People from Kampen, Overijssel
Dutch footballers
Dutch people of Turkish descent
Netherlands youth international footballers
SC Heerenveen players
Go Ahead Eagles players
SC Cambuur players
VVV-Venlo players
Gaziantepspor footballers
Adanaspor footballers
FC Emmen players
Şanlıurfaspor footballers
Eredivisie players
Eerste Divisie players
Süper Lig players
TFF Second League players
Footballers from Overijssel
Association football midfielders